Elections to Strathclyde Regional Council were held on Thursday 5 May 1994, on the same day as the eight other Scottish regional elections. This was the final election to the regional council which was abolished in 1995 along with the 19 district councils and replaced by 12 unitary authorities following the implementation of the Local Government etc. (Scotland) Act 1994.

This election was the only one to use the 104 electoral divisions created following the Second Statutory Reviews of Electoral Arrangements in 1993 – an increase of one from the previous election in 1990. The new electoral division was established in the Kilmarnock and Loudoun district. Each electoral division elected one councillor using first-past-the-post voting.

Labour, who had won every previous election to Strathclyde Regional Council, retained a large majority by winning 86 of the 104 seats – down four from the previous election. The Scottish National Party (SNP) became the second-largest party on the council after they won seven seats – up from just one four years previous. They overtook both the Liberal Democrats, who remained the third-largest party with six seats (an increase of two), and the Conservatives, who fell to fourth after retaining just three of their five seats. The other two seats were won by independent candidates.

Results

[
 {
  "type": "ExternalData",
  "service": "page",
  "title": "Scottish local elections/Strathclyde/Regional Council/Argyll and Bute/1994 results.map"
 },
 {
  "type": "ExternalData",
  "service": "page",
  "title": "Scottish local elections/Strathclyde/Regional Council/Dunbartonshire/1994 results.map"
 },
 {
  "type": "ExternalData",
  "service": "page",
  "title": "Scottish local elections/Strathclyde/Regional Council/Glasgow/1994 results.map"
 },
 {
  "type": "ExternalData",
  "service": "page",
  "title": "Scottish local elections/Strathclyde/Regional Council/Renfrewshire/1994 results.map"
 },
 {
  "type": "ExternalData",
  "service": "page",
  "title": "Scottish local elections/Strathclyde/Regional Council/Lanarkshire/1994 results.map"
 },
 {
  "type": "ExternalData",
  "service": "page",
  "title": "Scottish local elections/Strathclyde/Regional Council/Ayrshire/1994 results.map"
 }
]

Source:

Electoral division results

Kilmarnock Central

Kilmarnock South

Stewarton and Kilmarnock North

Irvine Valley

Cumnock

New Cumnock and Doon Valley

References

1994 Scottish local elections
1994